James Price Wallace (April 8, 1928 – April 17, 2017) was a justice of the Supreme Court of Texas from January 1, 1981 to September 1, 1988.

References

Justices of the Texas Supreme Court
1928 births
2017 deaths
20th-century American judges